The Platytrochozoa are a proposed basal clade of spiralian animals as the sister group of the Gnathifera. The Platytrochozoa were divided into the Rouphozoa and the Lophotrochozoa. A more recent study suggests that the mesozoans also belong to this group of animals, as sister of the Rouphozoa.

An alternative phylogeny was given in 2019, with a basal grouping of Mollusca and Entoprocta named Tetraneuralia, and a second grouping of Nemertea and Platyhelminthes named Parenchymia as sister of Annelida. In this proposal, Lophotrochozoa would become roughly synonymous with Platytrochozoa, and Rouphozoa would be unsupported.

References

Protostome unranked clades